A by-election was held for the New South Wales Legislative Assembly electorate of Shoalhaven in January 1861 because John Garrett resigned to become a police magistrate at Scone. The by-election allowed John Robertson to return to the Legislative Assembly after the Legislative Council had passed the Robertson Land Acts, which would open up the free selection of Crown land.

Dates

Results

John Garrett resigned to become a police magistrate.

See also
Electoral results for the district of Shoalhaven
List of New South Wales state by-elections

References

1862 elections in Australia
New South Wales state by-elections
1860s in New South Wales